Kamal Kenawi Ali Moustafa (born 6 June 1956) is an Egyptian former swimmer. He competed in three events at the 1972 Summer Olympics.

References

External links
 

1956 births
Living people
Egyptian male swimmers
Olympic swimmers of Egypt
Swimmers at the 1972 Summer Olympics
Place of birth missing (living people)
20th-century Egyptian people
21st-century Egyptian people